Eduardo Andrés Navea Silva (born 12 August 1987), known as Eduardo Navea, is a Chilean footballer that currently plays for Iberia in the Chilean First Division B.

Notes

External links
 
 

1987 births
Living people
Chilean footballers
Universidad de Chile footballers
Deportes Concepción (Chile) footballers
Santiago Wanderers footballers
Deportes Iberia footballers
Unión Temuco footballers
Association football forwards